The Nez Cassé series of locomotives is a large family of electric and diesel locomotives intended primarily for fast passenger service on the French SNCF railway system. Produced by Alsthom for use under multiple electrification networks and un-electrified lines, they have been in widespread use from 1976 into the 21st century. Classes produced in the main series were BB 7200/7600 and CC 6500 under 1.5 kV DC, BB15000 under 25 kV 50 Hz AC, BB 22200 (7200+15000) and CC 21000 under dual 1.5 kV DC and 25 kV 50 Hz AC, and the diesel CC 72000/72100. 

The locomotive series was developed from the 1964 quadruple-voltage CC 40100, designed by Paul Arzens, which was mainly used for Trans Europ Express international service. The CC 40100 featured a forward-leaning nose and windshield that drew comparisons with a broken-nose facial profile ("Nez Cassé"). A greater emphasis on crash protection for engine drivers in the following series added depth to the nose and emphasized the broken-nosed profile.

Other operators

The Nederlandse Spoorwegen NS Class 1600 and NS Class 1700 versions of BB 7200 continue in use on the Dutch railway system under 1.5 kV DC. The Belgian Railways Class 18 was the Belgian equivalent of CC 40100, and was in service from 1973 to 1999.

Moroccan  operator ONCF uses diesel locomotives similar to CC 72000, the ONCF DF 100. The ONCF E 900 is similar to the CC 6500 and the ONCF E 1300/1350 is similar to the BB 7200, both under 3 kV DC . The Portuguese CP Class 1900 and CP Class 1930 were built under license by Sorefame in 1981 as versions of CC 72000 and CP Class 2600 (electric) as version of BB22200. The South Korean Korail Class 8000 is a development for 25 kV 60 Hz AC with a Bo-Bo-Bo arrangement. Slovenian Railways uses 3 kV DC versions of CC 6500 (identical to the ONCF E900 and using the same transmition) as SŽ series 363.

The locomotives were to be assembled by Brazilian manufacturer EMAQ using knock-down kits imported from France, however, the bankruptcy of said manufacturer and severe financial difficulties at FEPASA meant that only two locomotives were actually completed. Both locomotives were used by FEPASA until its privatisation in the late-1990s and are now stored and effectively preserved as static displays because its successor concessionary companies Ferroban and Rumo Logística have largely abandoned further electrification work on the rest of the FEPASA network.

A single CC 21000 locomotive, CC 21003, was temporarily allocated to the U.S. Amtrak system as X996 in 1977 for testing on Amtrak's Northeast Corridor.

References

Nez Cassé
Alstom locomotives
MTE locomotives
Standard gauge electric locomotives of France
Passenger locomotives